Lillian Simon Freehof (1906 – November 24, 2004) was an American writer.

Biography
Lillian Simon was one of four children, and grew up in a town outside of Chicago where the majority of her neighbors were of Scandinavian descent. Her father was printer of a newspaper, and early in her life she worked for him as a proofreader. She attended the University of Wisconsin and, later, the University of Pittsburgh, studying psychology and taking a degree in English. Secretary of the K. A. M. Temple in Chicago, she married rabbi Solomon Freehof in 1934. That year, he became rabbi of the Rodef Shalom congregation in Pittsburgh, remaining in the role until 1966. Besides serving as rebbetzin, Lillian took to writing, producing a number of works for children that drew upon the aggadah. She also wrote The Right Way (1957), a book to teach ethics in religious schools. She was possessed of a talent for crochet, as well, and produced books on crafts for an adult audience. In the 1930s, she led other women of Rodef Shalom in the task of developing programs aimed at the blind; this included creating services using Braille prayer books, a program which would serve as a model for others throughout the United States. She also wrote short plays about Jewish holidays designed to be performed in the synagogue. She served with the United Jewish Federation and with a variety of other charities, and was at one time on the national board of the Federation of Temple Sisterhoods. The Freehofs had no children.

Selected works
The Bible Legend Book (1948)
Candle Light Stories (1951)
Stories of King David (1952)
Second Bible Legend Book (1952)
The Captive Rabbi: The Story of R. Meir of Rothenburg (1965)
Embroideries and Fabrics for Synagogue and Home (1966)

Awards 
 1953: National Jewish Book Award for Stories of King David

References

1906 births
2004 deaths
20th-century American women writers
American religious writers
Women religious writers
20th-century American non-fiction writers
Writers from Illinois
Writers from Pittsburgh
20th-century American Jews
Rebbetzins
University of Wisconsin–Madison alumni
University of Pittsburgh alumni
American women non-fiction writers
21st-century American Jews
21st-century American women